Naivela is a town and union council of Dera Ismail Khan District in Khyber Pakhtunkhwa province of Pakistan. It is located at 31°37'52N 70°46'58E and has an altitude of 151 metres (498 feet).

References

Union councils of Dera Ismail Khan District
Populated places in Dera Ismail Khan District